Niklas Hansson (born January 8, 1995) is a Swedish professional ice hockey defenceman who is currently playing with EV Zug of the National League (NL). He was selected by the Dallas Stars in the 3rd round (68th overall) of the 2013 NHL Entry Draft.

Playing career
Hansson made his Elitserien debut playing with Rögle BK during the 2012–13 Elitserien season.

At the conclusion of his first season with HV71 in 2015–16, Hansson agreed to a three-year, entry-level contract with his draft club, the Dallas Stars, on March 26, 2016. He immediately joined AHL affiliate, the Texas Stars, on an amateur try-out for the final stretch of their regular season and first round defeat in the post-season.

In the 2016–17 season, Hansson was loaned back to HV71 to continue his development. He contributed as a depth player to HV71's blueline, helping the club claim their fifth Championship in franchise history.

At the conclusion of his entry-level contract with the Dallas Stars following the 2018–19 season, having spent the entirety of his North American career in the AHL with affiliate, the Texas Stars, Hansson opted to return to his original hometown club, Rögle BK of the SHL. He signed a two-year contract on April 24, 2019.

On May 14, 2021, Hansson joined EV Zug of the National League (NL) on a two-year contract through the 2022–23 season.

Career statistics

Awards and honors

References

External links

1995 births
Living people
Dallas Stars draft picks
HV71 players
Rögle BK players
Swedish ice hockey defencemen
Texas Stars players
EV Zug players